MSPA may refer to:
Maritime Security Patrol Area, patrol zone in the Gulf of Aden, between Somalia and Yemen
Migrant and Seasonal Agricultural Workers Protection Act, United States law
Mississippi Association of Independent Schools, formerly the Mississippi Private School Association
MspA porin, protein produced by mycobacteria
Member, Society of Pension Actuaries; see American Society of Pension Professionals and Actuaries
MS Paint Adventures, a group of web-comics by Andrew Hussie
Multiple Spacecraft Per Aperture, shared antenna dish usage. see NASA Deep Space Network

See also
MSPAS